Point of Departure is an album by American jazz vibraphonist Gary McFarland featuring performances recorded in 1963 for the Impulse! label.

Reception
The Allmusic review by Scott Yanow awarded the album 4½ stars stating: "The music is bop-oriented, but also open to occasional innovations taken from the avant-garde. None of the songs caught on as standards, but they tend to stay in one's mind after finishing the album".

Track listing
All compositions by Gary McFarland except as indicated
 "Pecos Pete" – 5:19
 "Love Theme From David and Lisa" (Mark Lawrence) – 2:34
 "Sandpiper" – 7:44
 "Amour Tormentoso" – 3:26
 "Schlock-House Blues" – 6:17
 "I Love to Say Her Name" – 5:05
 "Hello to the Season" – 6:54
Recorded at RCA Studios in New York City by Bob Simpson on September 5, 1963 (tracks 4 & 5) and September 6, 1963 (tracks 1-3, 6 & 7)

Personnel
Gary McFarland – vibes
Willie Dennis – trombone
Richie Kamuca – tenor saxophone, oboe
Jimmy Raney – guitar
Steve Swallow – bass
Mel Lewis – drums

References

 

Impulse! Records albums
Gary McFarland albums
1963 albums
Albums produced by Bob Thiele